Marc Davis may refer to:

 Marc Davis (academic), computer science professor
 Mark Davis (actor) (born 1965), also credited as Marc Davis, British pornography actor
 Marc Davis (animator) (1913–2000), Walt Disney Studios animator
 Marc Davis (astronomer) (born 1947), astrophysicist and professor
 Marc Davis (racing driver) (born 1990), NASCAR driver
 Marc Davis (runner) (born 1969), American middle-distance runner

See also
 Marcus Davis (born 1973), fighter
 Marcus Davis (American football), (born 1989), wide receiver
 Mark Davis (disambiguation)